Ina Rilke is a Mozambique-born translator who specializes in translating Dutch literature and French literature into English.

Born in Mozambique, she went to school in Porto in Portugal, attending Oporto British School. She studied translation at the University of Amsterdam, where she later taught.

Writers she has translated include Hafid Bouazza, Louis Couperus, Hella Haasse, W. F. Hermans, Arthur Japin, Erwin Mortier, Multatuli, Cees Nooteboom, Connie Palmen, Pierre Péju and Dai Sijie. Rilke has won the Vondel Prize, the Scott Moncrieff Prize and the Flemish Culture Prize. She has also been nominated for the Best Translated Book Award, the Oxford-Weidenfeld Translation Prize, the Independent Foreign Fiction Prize, and the IMPAC Book Award.

Selected translations 
 Multatuli, Max Havelaar – New York Review Books
 Otto de Kat, News from Berlin – MacLehose Press, 2013 
 Adriaan van Dis, Betrayal – MacLehose Press, 2012 
 Hella S. Haasse, The Black Lake – Portobello Books, 2012 
 Otto de Kat, Julia – MacLehose Press, 2011 
 Cees Nooteboom, The Foxes Come at Night – MacLehose Press, 2011 
 Hella S. Haasse, The Tea Lords – Portobello Books, 2010
 Louis Couperus, Eline Vere – Archipelago, 2010 
 Judith Vanistendael, Dance by the Light of the Moon – SelfMadeHero, 2010
 Erwin Mortier, Shutterspeed – Harvill Secker, 2007
 W. F. Hermans, The Darkroom of Damocles – Harvill Secker, 2007
 W. F. Hermans, Beyond Sleep – Harvill Secker, 2006 
 Dai Sijie, Mr Muo and his Travelling Couch – Chatto & Windus, 2005 
 Pierre Péju, The Girl from the Chartreuse – Harvill, 2005
 Adriaan van Dis, My Father's War – Heinemann, 2004
 Erwin Mortier, My Fellow Skin – Harvill, 2003 
 Tessa de Loo, A Bed in Heaven – Arcadia, 2002
 Dai Sijie, Balzac and the Little Chinese Seamstress – Chatto & Windus, 2001
 Erwin Mortier, Marcel – Harvill, 2001 
 Oscar van den Boogaard, Love's Death – Farrar Straus & Giroux, 2001 
 Arthur Japin, The Two Hearts of Kwasi Boachi – Chatto & Windus, 2000 
 Hafid Bouazza, Abdullah's Feet – Headline Review, 2000 
 Connie Palmen, The Friendship – Harvill, 2000
 Cees Nooteboom, Roads to Santiago – Harvill, 1997 
 Margriet de Moor, The Virtuoso – Picador, 1996 
 Cees Nooteboom, The Following Story – Harvill, 1993

References

External links
 Translated by Ina Rilke – official website.

Living people
Dutch translators
University of Amsterdam alumni
Academic staff of the University of Amsterdam
Dutch–English translators
20th-century translators
21st-century translators
Year of birth missing (living people)